Sir William Gordon Bryce  (1913–2004) was Chief Justice of the Bahamas from 1 June 1970 to 30 June 1973.

He was the son of James Chisholm Bryce and his wife Emily Susan Lees, and was educated at Bromsgrove School and Hertford College, Oxford. He was called to the bar at the Middle Temple. He served in the British Army from 1940 to 1946, reaching the rank of Major. He joined the Colonial Service, with first post in Fiji, 1949.

References 

Colony of the Bahamas judges
1913 births
2004 deaths
Knights Bachelor
Commanders of the Order of the British Empire
Alumni of Hertford College, Oxford
British Army personnel of World War II
Queen's Royal Regiment officers
People educated at Bromsgrove School
Colonial Service officers
Royal Artillery officers